Peter Michael Dodds (born 26 November 1933) is a former cricketer who played first-class cricket in South Africa from 1955 to 1964.

Cricket career
Born in Durban, Dodds attended Durban High School. He played one match for Transvaal in 1955 before moving to Natal, where he spent the rest of his first-class career.

A left-arm spinner, Dodds had modest success until 1958–59, when he took 35 wickets at an average of 18.37, the third-highest tally of wickets in South Africa that season. In a friendly match at the end of the season against a Border and Eastern Province Combined XI he took 6 for 37 and 7 for 51 to give Natal an innings victory.

He played irregularly over the next three seasons, but played throughout 1962–63, taking 36 wickets at 21.72. In Natal's ten-wicket victory over Eastern Province he took 5 for 45 and 5 for 73. Natal won the Currie Cup, with five victories in six matches. Dodds was widely considered unfortunate not to be selected for the 1963-64 tour of Australia and New Zealand.

He played his last season of first-class cricket in 1963–64.

References

External links

1933 births
Living people
Cricketers from Durban
South African cricketers
Gauteng cricketers
KwaZulu-Natal cricketers